The 1991 British Formula 3000 Championship was the third season of the British Formula 3000 Championship. The series was won posthumously by Paul Warwick, driving for Mansell Madgwick Motorsport. He was tragically killed in an accident at Oulton Park when leading. Fredrik Ekblom finished as runner-up for AJS/GP. Julian Westwood finished third overall for CaneCordy Motorsport, a new team formed by ex-Williams personnel Michael Cane and Colin Cordy. Richard Dean was fourth with Superpower (pictured). Future International F3000 team Durango made their British F3000 debut. Kenny Brack, who would become 1996 International F3000 runner-up, 1998 IRL champion and a CART frontrunner, made a one-off appearance with the Alan Langridge team. Future Brabham female F1 driver Giovanna Amati made a couple of appearances for the GJ-Bromley team.

Drivers and teams
The following drivers and teams contested the 1991 British Formula 3000 Championship.

Results

British Formula 3000 Championship

Championship Standings

References

Formula 3000
British Formula 3000 Championship